Wang Sombun is a district (amphoe) in the southwestern part of Sa Kaeo province, eastern Thailand.

Geography
Neighbouring districts are (from the north clockwise) Wang Nam Yen and Khlong Hat of Sa Kaeo Province, Soi Dao and Kaeng Hang Maeo of Chanthaburi province, and Tha Takiap of Chachoengsao province.

History
The minor district (king amphoe) was established 1 July 1997 with three tambons split from Wang Nam Yen district. On 15 May 2007, all 81 minor districts upgraded to full districts. On 24 August the upgrade became official.

Administration
The district is divided into three sub-districts (tambons), which are further subdivided into 48 villages (mubans). Wang Sombun is a township (thesaban tambon) which covers tambon Wang Sombun. There are a further two tambon administrative organizations (TAO).

References

External links
amphoe.com

Wang Sombun